Hampton Road is the main road entering the City of Fremantle from the south. It is named after John Stephen Hampton, the Governor of Western Australia from 1862 to 1868. It continues into Ord Street at the north east corner of Fremantle Prison at Knutsford Street.

Heritage buildings and operations in historical properties occur along the length of the road; they include the Fremantle Children's Literature Centre, Hampton Road reserve, Bundi Kudja, and St Pauls Anglican Church in Beaconsfield.

At the Cockburn Road and Rockingham Road intersection, which forms the southern terminus of the road, traffic bound for Fremantle arrives from Spearwood and Kwinana further south, and is brought through a high-density residential area, and past Fremantle Hospital and Fremantle Prison, two of Fremantle's landmarks.

Major intersections
All intersections below are controlled by traffic signals unless otherwise indicated.

References

 

 
Streets in Fremantle